Coston is a village and former civil parish, now in the parish of Garthorpe in the Melton district, in the eastern part of Leicestershire, England. In 1931 the parish had a population of 74.

History 
The village's name means 'farm/settlement of Katr'.

On 1 April 1936 the parish was abolished and merged with Garthorpe.

Church
The parish church, dedicated to St Andrew, is thought to date back to the 13th century and was restored in 1846.

References

External links

Villages in Leicestershire
Former civil parishes in Leicestershire
Borough of Melton